The Vision of Fray Lauterio is a c.1640 oil on canvas painting by Murillo, now in the Fitzwilliam Museum in Cambridge, to which it was given by Joseph Prior in 1879. It had originally been owned by the Dominican monastery of La Regina Angelorum in Seville (hence its depiction of the Virgin Mary surrounded by angels) and was owned by Francesco Pereyra after that monastery was dissolved.

It shows the eponymous Franciscan friar to the right unable to understand a passage in Thomas Aquinas's Summa Theologica and praying to Francis of Assisi, shown on the left granting his prayer and pointing to Thomas himself in the centre.

References

Paintings of Francis of Assisi
Paintings of Thomas Aquinas
Paintings of the Virgin Mary
Paintings in the collection of the Fitzwilliam Museum